Ait Amira is a town and rural commune in the Chtouka-Aït Baha Province of the Souss-Massa region of Morocco. It is located about 20 kilometers northeast of the city of Agadir.

Geography 

Ait Amira is situated on the southern slopes of the High Atlas mountains, at an elevation of approximately 450 meters above sea level. It is surrounded by several smaller villages, including Tamanar and Bouizakarne.

Demographics 

As of the 2004 Moroccan census, the population of Ait Amira was 47,458 people living in 10,674 households.

Culture 

The town is known for its traditional Berber architecture, including mud-brick houses and narrow alleys. The weekly souk (market) is held on Sundays, and offers a wide variety of local products, such as argan oil, honey, and handicrafts.

Economy 

Ait Amira's economy is based mainly on agriculture, with a focus on argan cultivation and production. The town is also home to several small businesses and shops.

Transportation 

Ait Amira is accessible by road via the N8 national highway, which connects it to Agadir and other nearby towns. The closest airport is Al Massira Airport, located about 40 kilometers southwest of the town.

References

See also 

 Chtouka-Aït Baha Province
 Souss-Massa
 List of municipalities, communes, and arrondissements of Morocco

Populated places in Chtouka Aït Baha Province
Rural communes of Souss-Massa